Allen's hylomyscus or Allen's wood mouse (Hylomyscus alleni) is a species of rodent in the family Muridae. It is native to West and Central Africa, where it is widely distributed. It occurs in deciduous forest habitat.

References

Further reading

   

Hylomyscus
Rodents of Africa
Mammals described in 1838
Taxonomy articles created by Polbot